"Defeated" is a song by American singer Anastacia. It was written by J.R. Rotem, Damon Sharpe, and Anastacia for her fourth studio album, Heavy Rotation (2008), while production was helmed by Rotem. The song was released as the album's third and final single in May 2009, preceded by a release to European radio on March 23, 2009.

Critical reception
Mirror.co.uk wrote that Anastacia delivers some "lyrical howlers." Alex Fletcher of Digital Spy found that "lyrically, she never falters from her favourite subject of "standing up strong", even attempting to update "I Will Survive" for the noughties on "Defeated". "You can say that you won but I'll never believe it," she roars. "I can't be defeated!"."

Track listing
 Digital Download
 "Defeated" - 3:55

Credits and personnel
 Lead vocals: Anastacia
 Background vocals: Anastacia, J.R. Rotem
 Producers: J.R. Rotem
 Co-Producers: Damon Sharpe
 Recorded by J.R. Rotem at The Carrington House in Atlanta, GA
 Vocals recorded by Bill Malina at Westlake Recording Studios in Los Angeles, CA

Charts

Weekly charts

Year-end charts

Release history

References

2009 singles
Anastacia songs
Songs written by Anastacia
Songs written by J. R. Rotem
2008 songs
Mercury Records singles
Songs written by Damon Sharpe
Song recordings produced by J. R. Rotem